Marc Lemieux (born 22 June 1939) is a Canadian rower. He competed in the men's eight event at the 1964 Summer Olympics.

References

1939 births
Living people
Canadian male rowers
Olympic rowers of Canada
Rowers at the 1964 Summer Olympics
Place of birth missing (living people)
Pan American Games medalists in rowing
Pan American Games gold medalists for Canada
Medalists at the 1963 Pan American Games
Rowers at the 1963 Pan American Games
Rowers at the 1962 British Empire and Commonwealth Games
20th-century Canadian people